Ivana Pavlović (born August 22, 1974), better known as Ivana Peters or Ivana Negativ, is a Serbian singer-songwriter. Initially recognised as a member of the nineties dance-pop group Tap 011, she also became a lead singer of the pop-rock band Negative in 1999.

Pavlović appeared in the third season of the Serbian spin-off of Your Face Sounds Familiar in 2016, finishing in the fifth place.

She has also served as a back vocalist to many Serbian artists such as Jelena Karleuša, and wrote "Goodbye (Shelter)" performed by Sanja Vučić for the 2016 Eurovision Song Contest.

Pavlović was married to the Sunshine guitarist, Aleksandar Peters, with whom she has a daughter named Sara.

Discography 
With Tap 011
Novi Svet (1995)
Gaće (1996)
Možda ti se vratim kao Lesi (1997)
Igra (1998)

With Negative
Negative (1999)
Ni ovde ni tamo (2002)
Tango (2004)
Spusti me na zemlju (2009)

See also
Music of Serbia

References

1974 births
Living people
Singers from Belgrade
20th-century Serbian women singers
Serbian pop singers
Serbian rock singers
Serbian composers
21st-century Serbian women singers